The Saskatoon station is a railway station in Saskatoon, Saskatchewan, Canada. The city's only active railway station, it is located eight kilometers from the central business district. When it opened, the station hosted several arrivals and departures each day, although it is now only serviced by Via Rail's The Canadian. The station is equipped with a ticket counter, and waiting room. The station was declared a heritage railway station by the federal government in 1996.

The station was built in 1964 in the International Style, as part of the Chappell rail yards, by Canadian National Railway as a union station replacing the Old Canadian Pacific Saskatoon Railway Station.

References

External links 
 
 Via Station information

Via Rail stations in Saskatchewan
Transport in Saskatoon
Buildings and structures in Saskatoon
Designated Heritage Railway Stations in Saskatchewan
Railway stations in Canada opened in 1964
Union stations in Canada
Canadian National Railway stations in Saskatchewan
1964 establishments in Saskatchewan